Komi-Mawussi Agbetoglo (born 24 December 1993) is a Togolese table tennis player. He competed at the 2012 Summer Olympics in the Men's singles, but was defeated in the preliminary round.

References

External links
 

Togolese table tennis players
1993 births
Living people
Olympic table tennis players of Togo
Table tennis players at the 2012 Summer Olympics
21st-century Togolese people